Kléber may refer to:

 French cruiser Kléber, French armored cruiser active from 1904 to 1917
 Kléber (Paris Métro), Paris Métro station
 Kléber (train), former express train in France
 Lycée Kléber, secondary school in Strasbourg, France
 Place Kléber, central square of Strasbourg, France
 Kléber, a brand of tires owned by Michelin

Persons with the given name
 Kléber de Carvalho Corrêa (born 1980), Brazilian footballer
 Kléber Giacomance de Souza Freitas (born 1983), Brazilian footballer
 Kléber Guerra (born 1970), Brazilian footballer
 Kléber Laube Pinheiro (born 1990), Brazilian footballer
 Kléber (footballer, born 1998) (born 1998), Brazilian footballer

Persons with the surname
 Claus Kleber (born 1955), German journalist
 Emilio Kléber, nom de guerre of Manfred Stern, (1896–1954), Soviet spy and republican general during the Spanish Civil War
 Jean-Baptiste Kléber (1753–1800), French general
 João Kléber (born 1957), Brazilian comedian and TV presenter
 Maxi Kleber (born 1992), German basketball player

See also 
Cléber (disambiguation)